Holly Joy Sampson (born September 4, 1973), also known as Nicolette Foster, Andrea Michaels or Zoe is an American actress and model who has appeared in both mainstream and pornographic films over the course of her career. She is noted for her appearances on several television shows and her appearance in the 1990 comedy-drama feature film Pump Up The Volume. She is also known for playing the title role in the Emmanuelle 2000 series of films.

Early life
Sampson was born in Prescott, Arizona.

Career
As a teenager, Sampson had mainstream acting roles, appearing as Fred Savage's love interest in The Wonder Years episode "The Summer Song" (1989), and one episode each of My Two Dads, Beauty and the Beast and Matlock, as well as the film Pump Up The Volume. She starred in Other Men's Wives (1996) and had a minor role in the 1998 TV movie Gia.

Sampson has continued to have infrequent mainstream roles, most notably playing a teacher in teen comedy Pretty Cool (2001). She began her career in the porn industry by doing several hardcore films in 1998 under the single-name aliases "Nicolette" and "Zoe," but quickly left this side of the industry to perform in softcore films. Her credits from this softcore period (2000–2003) include erotic TV shows such as Lady Chatterly's Stories, The Voyeur, Thrills, The Best Sex Ever and Bedtime Stories. She also performed in a number of feature-length softcore films (under the name Holly Sampson), and non-hardcore fetish videos (under her alias Nicolette Foster). In 2008, Sampson returned to the hardcore non-fetish side of adult film, under the name Holly Sampson.

Personal life
In December 2009, Sampson was one of several women linked to professional golfer Tiger Woods's marital infidelities. She claimed on an adult website video that she had sex with him at his bachelor party. She later stated that she did not have an affair with Woods while he was married.

See also
List of pornographic actors who appeared in mainstream films

References

External links 

 
 
 

1973 births
American child actresses
American female adult models
American pornographic film actresses
American television actresses
Living people
People from Prescott, Arizona
Pornographic film actors from Arizona
21st-century American women